The 1901 Arkansas Cardinals football team was an American football team that represented the University of Arkansas as an independent during the 1901 college football season. In its first season under head coach Charles Thomas, the team compiled a 3–5 record and outscored opponents by a total of 98 to 52.

Schedule

References

Arkansas
Arkansas Razorbacks football seasons
Arkansas Cardinals football